Arturo Castro Rivas Cacho (March 21, 1918 – March 6, 1975) was a Mexican character actor who was often credited and nicknamed as "El Bigotón," due to his distinctive mustache.

Film career
Arturo Castro's film career spanned four decades and he is probably best remembered for appearing in eleven Viruta and Capulina feature films. He also appeared in the 1964 Cantinflas film El padrecito as Nepomuceno, a peasant who wishes to name his newborn son after himself, but Cantinflas disapproves of his name and refuses to baptize the child.

Personal life
Arturo Castro was Benito Castro's father, Gualberto Castro's uncle, telenovela actress Daniela Castro's great-uncle, and Lupe Rivas Cacho's nephew. He was born and died in Mexico City, Mexico.

Selected filmography
Los chiflados del rock and roll (1957)
Miércoles de ceniza (1958)
El rey del tomate (1963)
El padrecito (1964)
Los Beverly de Peralvillo (1971)
Que familia tan cotorra! (1973)

Television work
Los Beverly de Peralvillo (1968-1973)

References

External links

Mexican male film actors
Mexican male television actors
1918 births
1975 deaths
20th-century Mexican male actors